Jessica J. Lee is a British and Canadian author, environmental historian, and the founding editor of The Willowherb Review.

Biography 
Lee was born in Canada, to a Welsh father and a Taiwanese mother. She was brought up in Canada, lived in London and  Berlin.

She received her BA from University of King's College in Halifax, her MA from University of London. She then received her PhD in Environmental History and Aesthetics from York University.

In 2018, Lee founded The Willowherb Review. Lennie Goodings, in A Bite of the Apple, listed Lee's founding of the review in naming her as an instance of an individual famous for their feminist views putting their fame and fortune to use to act on their beliefs.

Reviewers noted that her 2019 memoir Two Trees Make a Forest incorporates elements of environmental analysis to her account of exploring Taiwan, where her mother was born. The book won the 2020 Hilary Weston Writers' Trust Prize for Nonfiction.

Awards
Lee won the 2019 RBC Taylor Prize for emerging authors. The prize came with $10,000 cash, and the mentorship of Kate Harris.

Publications

References

Living people
British nature writers
British writers
Canadian travel writers
Place of birth missing (living people)
21st-century Canadian women writers
University of King's College alumni
Alumni of the University of London
York University alumni
Canadian memoirists
Canadian people of Taiwanese descent
21st-century memoirists
Canadian women memoirists
Year of birth missing (living people)